Bruno Alberti (born 23 May 1934) is an Italian former alpine skier. He competed at the 1960 Winter Olympics and the 1964 Winter Olympics.

References

External links
 

1934 births
Living people
Italian male alpine skiers
Olympic alpine skiers of Italy
Alpine skiers at the 1960 Winter Olympics
Alpine skiers at the 1964 Winter Olympics
People from Cortina d'Ampezzo
Sportspeople from the Province of Belluno
20th-century Italian people